Boule de Suif is a 1934 Soviet drama film directed and written by Mikhail Romm. It is an adaptation of eponymous short story by Guy de Maupassant.

Plot 
A group of French capitalists leave Rouen, occupied by Prussia. They are accompanied by a pretty woman.

Starring 
 Galina Sergeyeva as Mlle. Elizabeth Rousset (Boule-de-suif)
 Andrey Fayt as Prussian Officer
 Faina Ranevskaya as Mme. Loiseau
 Pyotr Repnin as Lamadon, miller
 Tatyana Okunevskaya as Mme Carre-Lamadon
 Mikhail Mukhin as Count de Breville
 Anatoliy Goryunov as Louiseau, wine merchant
 Karl Gurnyak as German soldier
 Valentina Kuznetsova as Maid
 Vladimir Lavrinovich as Cornudet
 Vladimir Osenev as German soldier (uncredited)

References

External links 

1934 films
1930s Russian-language films
Soviet black-and-white films
1934 drama films
Soviet drama films
Films based on Boule de Suif
Franco-Prussian War films